Penstemon calcareus is a species of penstemon known by the common name limestone beardtongue. It is native to California, where it is known from the deserts of central San Bernardino County, as well as the Death Valley area, where its distribution extends just over the border into Nevada. It grows in scrub and woodland, often on limestone substrates. It is a perennial herb with erect branches up to about 25 centimeters in maximum height, grayish with a coating of fine hairs. The toothed, lance-shaped leaves are up to 6 centimeters long. The inflorescence produces bright pink to purplish tubular or funnel-shaped flowers between 1 and 2 centimeters long. The flower has a glandular outer surface and a staminode coated with yellow hairs.

References

External links

calcareus
Flora of California
Flora of Nevada
Flora of the United States